Juan M. Pichardo (born October 21, 1966) is a Dominican American politician. A Democrat, he was a member of the Rhode Island Senate who represented District 2 from January 2003 to 2017.

Education
Pichardo earned his AA degree from the Community College of Rhode Island and his BA from Rhode Island College.

Elections
2012 Pichardo was unopposed for the September 11, 2012 Democratic Primary, winning with 1,332 votes; returning 2010 Democratic Primary challenger Luis Pimental, ran as an Independent, setting up a rematch. Pichardo won the three-way November 6, 2012 General election with 5,132 votes (81.4%) against Independents Ramon Perez and Pimental.
2000 Pichardo challenged District 10 Democratic Senator Robert Kells in the September 12, 2000 Democratic Primary, but lost to Senator Kells, who won re-election in the November 7, 2000 General election against Republican nominee Ellen O'Hara.
2002 Redistricted to District 2, and with incumbent Democratic Senator John Roney leaving the Legislature, Pichardo won the September 10, 2002 Democratic Primary with 2,222 votes (58.2%), and won the four-way November 5, 2002 General election with 3,518 votes (74.2%) against Independent candidates Rochelle Bates Lee, Pedro Espinal, and Republican nominee Yvon Chancy.
2004 Pichardo was challenged in the September 14, 2004 Democratic Primary, winning with 1,687 votes (73.3%), and won the November 2, 2004 General election with 4,325 votes (86.8%) against Republican nominee Brian Mayben, who had run for Senate in 2002 and House in 1996 and 1998.
2006 Pichardo was unopposed for the September 12, 2006 Democratic Primary, winning with 1,474 votes, and won the November 7, 2006 General election with 4,223 votes (87.8%) against Republican nominee Donald Roach.
2008 Pichardo and returning 2004 Republican challenger Brian Mayben both won their September 9, 2008 primaries, setting up a rematch; Pichard won the November 4, 2008 General election with 5,669 votes (90.2%) against Mayben.
2010 Pichardo was challenged in the September 23, 2010 Democratic Primary, winning with 2,480 votes (74.9%), and was unopposed for the November 2, 2010 General election, winning with 3,706 votes (86.5%) against Republican nominee Robert Kenny.

References

External links
Official page at the Rhode Island General Assembly
Campaign site

Juan Pichardo at Ballotpedia
Juan M. Pichardo at OpenSecrets

1966 births
Living people
American politicians of Dominican Republic descent
Community College of Rhode Island alumni
Dominican Republic emigrants to the United States
Hispanic and Latino American state legislators in Rhode Island
Politicians from Providence, Rhode Island
Rhode Island College alumni
Democratic Party Rhode Island state senators
21st-century American politicians